Curtis LaDonn Buckley (born September 25, 1970) is a former American football cornerback in the National Football League for the Tampa Bay Buccaneers, San Francisco 49ers, New York Giants, and Washington Redskins.  He played college football at Kilgore College for 2 years and then East Texas State University (now Texas A&M University–Commerce), where he was a two time All-American and two time First-team All-Conference.

Early life
Buckley was born in Oakdale, Louisiana and then moved to the Southeast Texas town of Silsbee. He attended Silsbee High School where he was a standout in Football. After graduation, he took a scholarship to attend Kilgore College to play Football.

College career

Kilgore College
Buckley played two years for the Kilgore College Rangers football team, from 1989 to 1990. During the 1990 season he was All-Conference, helping the Rangers to a 9-2 record and a Texas Junior College Conference championship and a victory in the 1990 Shrine Bowl.

East Texas State
Buckley played for two years at East Texas State in Commerce, TX under coach Eddie Vowell. During the 1991 season, Buckley led a Lion defense that was a top 5 ranked defense nationally and was first-team All-Conference and Honorable Mention All-American at Safety. The Lions finished 2nd in the Lone Star Conference with an 8-4-1 record and qualified for the NCAA Division II playoffs, finishing as National Quarterfinalists and the 19th ranked team in the country. During the 1991 season in a game against eventual national champion Pittsburg State, his hit on Pittsburg State Quarterback Brian Hutchins broke the quarterback's collarbone and helped the Lions take down the Gorillas, 20-13 to vault them to a # 4 national ranking.  In the 1992 season, Buckley once again was First-team All-Conference and was Second-team All-American as the Lions finished 8-3 and ranked 14th in the nation.

Professional career
Buckley went undrafted in the 1993 NFL draft but signed with the Tampa Bay Buccaneers. Head coach Sam Wyche was preparing to cut him in preseason before Buckley impressed his coaches by performing a flip on the field. Buckley became a fan favorite for his punishing hits on kick coverage and his propensity to perform acrobatics such as backflips in the end zone prior to kickoffs that followed Buccaneers scores. With the addition of Kenneth Gant, the Bucs' other gunner, Buckley and Gant took it upon themselves to stoke the crowd after every score, with Gant's "shark dance" building the crowd into a crescendo that culminated in Buckley's flip just as the ball was kicked.  In 1994, Buckley knocked Brian Mitchell unconscious during a Week 14 game. Buckley was not penalized, but was later fined. Both Wyche and Mitchell said that they thought that it was a clean hit. Buckley was waived by the Buccaneers after 4 seasons and spent three seasons with the San Francisco 49ers before brief stints with the Giants and Redskins. He was named a Pro Bowl alternate three times as a special teamer.

Personal life
Buckley currently works as a behavioral health specialist in Dallas and resides in Mesquite, Texas with his family.

References

1970 births
Living people
American football cornerbacks
Kilgore Rangers football players
New York Giants players
San Francisco 49ers players
Tampa Bay Buccaneers players
Texas A&M–Commerce Lions football players
Washington Redskins players
People from Oakdale, Louisiana
People from Silsbee, Texas
Players of American football from Texas
African-American players of American football
20th-century African-American sportspeople
21st-century African-American sportspeople